List of works by or about John Dos Passos, American author.

Novels
 One Man's Initiation: 1917 (1920). Reprinted in 1945, under the title First Encounter
 Three soldiers (1921)
 Streets of Night (1923)
 Manhattan Transfer (1925)
 U.S.A. (1938). Three-volume set includes
 The 42nd Parallel (1930)
 Nineteen Nineteen (1932)
 The Big Money (1936)
 District of Columbia (1952). Three-volume set includes
 Adventures of a Young Man (1939)
 Number One (1943)
 The Grand Design (1949)
 Chosen Country (1951)
 Most Likely to Succeed (1954)
 The Great Days (1958)
 Midcentury (1961)
 Century's Ebb: The Thirteenth Chronicle (1970) —incomplete
 U.S.A.: The 42nd Parallel, 1919, The Big Money (Daniel Aaron and Townsend Ludington, eds.) (Library of America, 1996) .
 Novels 1920–1925: One Man's Initiation: 1917, Three Soldiers, Manhattan Transfer (Townsend Ludington, ed.) (Library of America, 2003) .

Non-fiction 
 Rosinante to the Road Again (1922)
 Facing the Chair (1927)
 Orient Express (1927)
 Tour of Duty (1946)
 The Ground We Stand On (1949)
 "Art and Isadora" (reissued 1953)
 The Head and Heart of Thomas Jefferson (1954)
 The Theme Is Freedom (1956)
 The Men Who Made the Nation (1957)
 Prospects of a Golden Age (1959)
 Mr. Wilson's War (1962)
 Brazil on the Move (1963)
 The Best Times: An Informal Memoir  (1966)
 The Shackles of Power (1966)
 World in a Glass – A View of Our Century From the Novels of John Dos Passos (1966)
 The Portugal Story (1969)
 Easter Island: Island of Enigmas (1970)
 Travel Books & Other Writings 1916–1941: Rosinante to the Road Again; Orient Express; In All Countries; A Pushcart to the Curb; Essays, Letters, Diaries (Townsend Ludington, ed.) (Library of America, 2003) 
 Lettres à Germaine Lucas Championnière (2007) – only in French

Poetry 
Collections
 A Pushcart at the Curb (1922)

Plays 
 The Garbage Man: a Parade with Shouting (New York: Harper & Brothers, 1926)

Notes and full bibliographic citations 

Bibliographies by writer
Bibliographies of American writers